What Women Want is a 2000 American romantic fantasy comedy film written by Josh Goldsmith, Cathy Yuspa, and Diane Drake, directed by Nancy Meyers, and starring Mel Gibson and Helen Hunt.

The film earned mixed reviews from critics but was a box office success, with a North American domestic gross of $182 million and a worldwide gross of $374 million against a budget of $70 million.

A loose remake, What Men Want, was released in 2019, starring Taraji P. Henson and Aldis Hodge.

Plot
Nick Marshall, a Chicago advertising executive, was raised by his Las Vegas showgirl mother. Nick is a chauvinist skilled at selling products to men and seducing women. He expects to get a promotion at the advertising firm Sloane Curtis, but his manager Dan instead announces that he is hiring Darcy Maguire to broaden the firm's appeal to women. Meanwhile, Nick's estranged 15-year-old daughter Alex, is staying with him while his former wife Gigi is on her honeymoon with her new husband Ted. Nick embarrasses Alex, who resents his over-protectiveness when he meets her boyfriend Cameron, who is 18 years old.

Darcy tasks the staff, including Nick, to develop advertising ideas for a series of feminine products she distributes at the staff meeting. While testing a few items at home, Nick falls into his bathtub while holding an electric hairdryer, shocking himself, and is knocked unconscious. The next morning, Nick awakens to discover he has a new gift: he can hear women's thoughts. He has an epiphany, realizing that most women, especially at work, dislike him and consider him sleazy. He makes an impromptu visit to his former therapist, Dr. Perkins (who also disliked him), and she encourages him to use his newfound ability to his advantage.

Nick telepathically eavesdrops on Darcy and purloins her ideas to use as his own, but gradually becomes attracted to her. Alex resents Nick's years of neglect, but they start to bond while he takes her shopping for a prom dress. After Nick telepathically finds out that Alex intends to sleep with Cameron the night of the prom, Nick attempts to give her some advice. He tells her Cameron is not interested in her for who she is, just for what he can do with her in bed. Alex, thinking Nick is being over-protective and trying to sabotage her prom, rejects his advice.

Nick and Darcy spend more time together, becoming romantic. However, he steals Darcy's idea for a new Nike ad campaign aimed at women, though he later regrets his actions, especially as it leads to Dan firing Darcy. Nick persuades Dan to rehire Darcy, saying the ad was her idea and is eventually successful.

Over time, Nick succeeds in repairing his relationships with female acquaintances, especially those at work. Nick loses his gift during a severe thunder and lightning storm while on his way to see the company secretary, Erin, who has been contemplating suicide. He offers her a position for which he had previously turned her down; she accepts. When Cameron dumps Alex at the prom for refusing to have sex, Nick finds and consoles her, cementing their newly repaired relationship. Nick visits Darcy and explains everything. She fires him, but then forgives him, and they share a kiss.

Cast
 Mel Gibson as Nick Marshall: A Chicago advertising executive, who acquires the gift to hear what women are thinking.
 Helen Hunt as Darcy Maguire: Nick's co-worker, who later becomes his love interest.
 Marisa Tomei as Lola: Nick's former love interest, who works in a coffee shop and is trying to become an actress.
Alan Alda as Dan Wanamaker, Nick's boss.
 Ashley Johnson as Alex Marshall: Nick's daughter, who comes to stay with him, while her mom Gigi and stepdad Ted go on their honeymoon.  She has a boyfriend named Cameron, who will "dump" her, after she declines sleeping with him right away.  She at first, has a rocky relationship with her dad, but in the end reconciles with him.
 Mark Feuerstein as Morgan Farwell
Lauren Holly as Gigi: Nick's ex-wife, mother of Alex, and just married to Ted; they leave on their honeymoon in the first scenes.
Delta Burke as Eve
 Valerie Perrine as Margo
 Judy Greer as Erin: A copy girl at Nick's workplace who is always ignored, had been turned down indirectly by Nick for a promotion, and is contemplating suicide.
 Sarah Paulson as Annie: Nick's secretary, a job limited to running menial errands for Nick, which she sees as degrading, in light of her Ivy League education. She has a boyfriend who lives in Israel.
Ana Gasteyer as Sue Cranston
 Lisa Edelstein as Dina
 Loretta Devine as Flo
Diana-Maria Riva as Stella
Eric Balfour as Cameron: Alexandra's much older boyfriend, who is manipulative and abandons the relationship, after she tells him that she is not ready to sleep with him after the prom.
Logan Lerman as Young Nick Marshall
 Robert Briscoe Evans as Ted: Second husband of Gigi and stepfather of Alexandra.  He leaves with Gigi at the beginning of the movie to go on their honeymoon.
Alex McKenna as Alexandra's friend
 Bette Midler as Dr. J. M. Perkins (uncredited)

Reception

Box office
What Women Want made $33.6 million during its opening weekend. The film topped the box office upon opening, dethroning How the Grinch Stole Christmas. Additionally, it had the highest December opening weekend of all time, surpassing Scream 2. This record would last until 2001 when Ocean's Eleven took it. For its second weekend, What Women Want was overtaken by Helen Hunt's other film Cast Away. It went on to make $182.8 million domestically and $374.1 million worldwide.

Critical response
Rotten Tomatoes gave the film an approval rating of 54% based on 122 reviews, with an average rating of 5.7/10. The site's critical consensus reads, "Even though Gibson is a good sport in his role, What Women Want is a rather conventional, fluffy comedy-romance that doesn't make good use of its premise." On Metacritic the film has a score of 47 out of 100, based on 33 critics, indicating "mixed or average reviews". On CinemaScore, audiences gave the film an average grade of "B+" on an A+ to F scale.

In a lukewarm review, Kimberley Jones of The Austin Chronicle praised Gibson's performance and likened parts of the film to classic screwball comedies, but felt the ending became a "dull, drawn-out morality play". Roger Ebert wrote the movie "doesn't flow so much as leap from one good scene to another over the crevices of flat scenes in between ... it's not boring and is often very funny". Stephanie Zacharek of
Salon.com was critical: "Although What Women Want is being marketed toward women, it does nothing but condescend to them."

Awards
For his portrayal of Nick Marshall, Gibson was nominated for the Golden Globe Award for Best Actor – Motion Picture Musical or Comedy and a Blockbuster Entertainment Award for Favorite Actor—Comedy/Romance. Hunt won the latter award in the Favorite Actress—Comedy/Romance category, while Mark Feuerstein and Marisa Tomei each received a nomination in the supporting categories. It also garnered Tomei a nod for the Satellite Award for Best Supporting Actress – Motion Picture, while Ashley Johnson was nominated at the Young Artist Awards.

For his score, composer Alan Silvestri won the ASCAP Award for Top Box Office Films, it received a Saturn Award nomination for "Best Fantasy Film" from the Academy of Science Fiction, Fantasy & Horror Films, US.  The film also won the Bogey Award in Platin from the Bogey Awards, Germany. It was also nominated for the Best Casting for Feature Film, Comedy from the Casting Society of America, US. It received the Golden Screen Award in Germany.

Legacy

Sequel/remake
In 2009, the website Pajiba published an article reporting that producer and scriptwriter Peter Chiarelli was working on a sequel, which would re-imagine the concept from the viewpoint of a woman who could hear men's thoughts. Cameron Diaz was courted to star as its lead. The film was released in 2019 as What Men Want with Taraji P. Henson in the lead role.

Foreign market remakes
A Chinese remake directed by Chen Daming starring Andy Lau and Gong Li was released in 2011.

Aga Bai Arrecha! in 2004 is a Marathi film directed by Kedar Shinde from India that is loosely based on What Women Want.

References

External links
 
 
 
 
 
 
 

2000 films
2000s fantasy comedy films
2000 romantic comedy films
2000s romantic fantasy films
American fantasy comedy films
American romantic comedy films
American romantic fantasy films
2000s English-language films
Films about advertising
Films directed by Nancy Meyers
Films produced by Bruce Davey
Films scored by Alan Silvestri
Films set in Chicago
Films shot in Chicago
Films shot in Los Angeles
Icon Productions films
Paramount Pictures films
Films about telepathy
Magic realism films
Films set in offices
2000s American films